Elachista imbi is a moth of the family Elachistidae that is endemic to Austria.

References

imbi
Moths described in 1992
Endemic fauna of Austria
Moths of Europe